Plectranthias whiteheadi, Whitehead's basslet, is a species of fish in the family Serranidae occurring in the Western Pacific. Little is known about this relatively small species which maximum length is about 7.8 cm SL.

IUCN has evaluated Plectranthias chungchowensis, but this species, described as endemic to Taiwan, is a junior synonym of P. whiteheadi.

Size

References

Randall, J.E., 1980. Revision of the fish genus Plectranthias (Serranidae: Anthiinae) with description of 13 new species. Micronesia 16(1):101-187.

Fish of Taiwan
whiteheadi
Taxa named by John Ernest Randall 
Fish described in 1980
Taxonomy articles created by Polbot
Taxobox binomials not recognized by IUCN